The 2014–15 Lafayette Leopards women's basketball team represented Lafayette College during the 2014–15 NCAA Division I women's basketball season. The Leopards, led by fifth year head coach Dianne Nolan, played their home games at Kirby Sports Center and were members of the Patriot League. They finished the season 14–17, 6–12 in Patriot League play to finish in seventh place. They lost in the quarterfinals of the Patriot League women's tournament to American.

Roster

Schedule

|-
!colspan=9 style="background:#800000; color:#000000;"| Exhibition

|-
!colspan=9 style="background:#800000; color:#000000;"| Non-Conference Regular season

|-
!colspan=9 style="background:#800000; color:#000000;"| Patriot League Regular season

|-
!colspan=9 style="background:#800000; color:#000000;"| Patriot League Women's Tournament

See also
 2014–15 Lafayette Leopards men's basketball team

References

Lafayette
Lafayette Leopards women's basketball seasons
Lafayette Leopards women's basketball
Lafayette Leopards women's basketball